England national under-16 football team, also known as England under-16s or England U16(s), represents England in association football at an under-16 age level and is controlled by the Football Association, the governing body for football in England.

Competition history
Between 1925 and 2014, the England under-16 team competed in the annual Victory Shield tournament against Scotland, Wales and Northern Ireland. Since World War II, England had won the Victory Shield outright thirty-five times and had been joint winners with Scotland eight times, with Wales twice and with both Scotland and Wales twice. However, in April 2015, the Football Association decided to withdraw from the tournament "for the foreseeable future" with the stated aim of replacing it with matches against European and global opposition.

Montaigu Tournament
In 2005, the team made their debut in the annual Montaigu Tournament, held in Montaigu, France. England have won the competition three times, in 2008, 2011, and 2015, defeating the hosts France in the final on all three occasions. In 2008 and 2011, England won in a penalty shoot-out after a 0–0 draw, while in 2015 they won the final outright by 3–1. In 2019, England finished third overall after losing 2–1 to eventual champions Argentina, winning 5–0 against Ivory Coast, 3–1 against Portugal in the group stage and 4–0 against Brazil in the 3rd place playoff

Fixtures and results 2021

Friendly matches

Players

Current squad
Squad for the Val de Marne Tournament in November 2021

References

External links
Official website Football Association

16
European national under-16 association football teams